Gyland is a former municipality in the old Vest-Agder county, Norway.  The  municipality was located in the northeastern part of the present-day municipality of Flekkefjord in what is now Agder county.  The municipality existed very briefly from 1838 until 1839 and then it was re-created in 1893 and it existed until 1965.  The administrative centre was the village of Gyland where Gyland Church is located.

History
The parish of Gyland was established as a municipality on 1 January 1838 (see formannskapsdistrikt law), but it was almost immediately merged into neighboring Bakke municipality in the fall of 1839.  The Gyland area (population: 1,085) was separated (again) from Bakke municipality on 31 December 1893 to once again form its own municipality.  During the 1960s, there were many municipal mergers across Norway due to the work of the Schei Committee. On 1 January 1965, the municipalities of Gyland, Bakke, Hidra, and Nes were merged with the town of Flekkefjord to form a new, larger municipality of Flekkefjord. Prior to the merger, Gyland had a population of 691.

Name
The municipality (originally the parish) was named after the old Gyland farm, where the Gyland Church was originally located.  The first element is the old name of the river that flows past the farm ( or ) and the last element is land which means "land".

Government
All municipalities in Norway, including Gyland, are responsible for primary education (through 10th grade), outpatient health services, senior citizen services, unemployment and other social services, zoning, economic development, and municipal roads.  The municipality was governed by a municipal council of elected representatives, which in turn elected a mayor.

Municipal council
The municipal council  of Gyland was made up of representatives that were elected to four year terms.  The party breakdown of the final municipal council was as follows:

See also
List of former municipalities of Norway

References

Flekkefjord
Former municipalities of Norway
1838 establishments in Norway
1839 disestablishments in Norway
1893 establishments in Norway
1964 disestablishments in Norway